The Mainland Travel Permit for Taiwan Residents, also known as Taiwan Compatriot Permit, is a type of travel document issued by Government of the People's Republic of China (PRC) to the Republic of China nationals (ROC) who hold household registration in Taiwan. The document is issued by the Ministry of Public Security (MPS). Since the identity documents issued by the government of the Republic of China are not recognized in the PRC, the permit serves as both the main travel document and identity document for Taiwanese people in the PRC territory and is used in all occasions in lieu of the Taiwan passport.

Background and usage 

Due to the special political status of Taiwan, neither the PRC nor the ROC recognizes the passports issued by the other and neither considers travel between mainland China and Taiwan as formal international travel. This permit is therefore issued as the travel document for Taiwanese residents to enter mainland China since 1987, when then President of the Republic of China, Chiang Ching-Kuo, decided to lift the mutual travel ban across the Taiwan Strait.

The design of the older permits, issued until July 2015, takes the form of a regular machine-readable passport, but it does not have the National Emblem of the People's Republic of China printed on its cover as the regular PRC passport does. The document is valid for 5 years and has 32 pages. The design of the current version takes the form of an ID card, and is nearly identical to the Mainland Travel Permit for Hong Kong and Macao Residents with a few differences, such as a different color scheme. Newer permits are also valid for 5 years.

This entry permit serves also as the de facto ID card for ROC nationals who are residents of Taiwan in mainland China. As a result, the permit can be accepted in cases of real estate purchasing, banking, medical treatment, insurance, employment, and more.

Due to its usage as an ID card and the increasing instances of Taiwanese's long-time stay and settlement in mainland China, the Taiwan Affairs Office announced that effective from 24 September 2008, the serial number of the Mainland Travel Permit for Taiwan Residents will remain unchanged for the person's lifetime. The permit served as a de facto identification card for Taiwan residents in mainland China until the Residence Permit for Taiwan Residents was issued in September 2018.

Application

Long-term travel permit 
Taiwanese can apply for the permit in China Travel Service's Hong Kong or Macau branches or through travel agencies in Taiwan. Renewals can be done in CTS branches in Hong Kong and Macau, travel agencies in Taiwan, as well as Exit and Entry Administration bureaus in mainland China.

Single-entry travel permit 
The single-entry travel permit (not to be confused with "entry endorsements", now abolished) is intended for Taiwanese residents who have never held the travel permit, or whose travel permit has recently expired, and who needs to travel to mainland China. To be eligible, the applicant must hold his or her Taiwanese passport with remaining validity for more than six months, in conjunction with the person's Taiwanese ID card as well as two 2-inch photos. Some airports may require additional documents, such as a return ticket or an invitation letter. Eligible airports are: Shenyang, Qingdao, Dalian, Shanghai, Fuzhou, Xiamen, Wuhan, Chengdu, Haikou, Sanya, Beijing, Nanjing, Chongqing, Hangzhou, Guilin, Shenzhen, Xi'an, Changsha, Kunming, Harbin, Ningbo, Wuxi, Nanning, Wenzhou, Yancheng, Xuzhou, Zhengzhou, Changchun, Yantai, Tianjin, Jinan, Guiyang, Quanzhou, Nanchang and Hefei. The single-entry travel permit is valid for a stay up to 3 months. Holder of a valid, long-term travel permit is not eligible to use this service, he or she must instead carry the long-term permit or will be refused entry for not doing so.

Entry endorsements (abolished) 

Prior to 1 July 2015, for each entry into mainland China, permit holders needed to apply for an entry endorsement, which could be in the form of an immigration stamp or a visa-like vignette, that shows the document bearer's allowed duration of stay inside mainland China. Additional single-entry endorsements could be applied at Hong Kong International Airport and Macau International Airport outside mainland China. Entry endorsements were classified as:
 Single entry for 3 months (HKD 150)
 Multiple entry within 1, 2 or 3 years
Certain employment, education or investment certification was required when applying for a 2- or 3-year multi-entry endorsements. In practice most Taiwanese travel agencies would prepare the necessary forms and have the documents with valid permits sent back to Taiwan by air. Around 1% of the applications are rejected, mainly to sensitive identities such as pro-Taiwan independence/Tibet independence figures, Falun Gong members and the like. Permit bearer could also apply for 3-month single-entry endorsement on arrival for CNY 100 in the following mainland Chinese airports or harbors, as long as the permit remains valid:
 Airports: Beijing, Chengdu, Chongqing, Dalian, Fuzhou, Guangzhou, Guilin, Haikou, Hangzhou, Nanjing, Qingdao, Sanya, Shanghai, Shenyang, Shenzhen, Wuhan, Xiamen.
 Harbors: Fuzhou, Quanzhou, Xiamen.

Abolition 
Effective from 1 July 2015, holders of the permit are no longer required to apply for entry endorsements when arriving in mainland China. The length of stay for Taiwanese residents are no longer restricted, however holder of the permit must leave mainland China before the expiration date of the permit, or they must apply for renewal at the local MPS office.

Entering Hong Kong and Macau with the Permit 
Hong Kong authorities accept either ROC passports or Mainland Travel Permits for Taiwan Residents to enter Hong Kong. For ROC passport holders, a Pre-arrival Registration along with a printout copy is required while the ROC passport is inspected. Entry and exit stamps were abolished in Hong Kong in 2013 and visitors are now only issued "landing slips", a separated piece of paper which does not attach to passports. For holders of the Permit, valid Hong Kong Entry Permit used to be required, but in early 2009, Hong Kong authorities announced that effective from 27 April 2009, Hong Kong would grant 7-day visa-free access to Permit holders. Started from 1 September 2011, the visa-free period was further increased to 30 days.

Macau allows the holders of the permit and ROC passports for entry, all permit holders and ROC passport holders are granted a visa-free stay of 30 days.

Recent changes
During the 7th Straits Forum in Xiamen, Fujian in June 2015, Chairman of the National Committee of the Chinese People's Political Consultative Conference, Yu Zhengsheng, announced the abolition of entry endorsements and the restrictions on the period of stay for Taiwanese to visit or reside in mainland China. The booklet-format travel permit was transformed into an ICAO-compliant biometric card, resembling the Mainland Travel Permit for Hong Kong and Macao Residents. The change can be seen as facilitating travel between Taiwan and mainland China. The new policy took effect on 1 July 2015.

In November 2015, the municipality of Shanghai has announced that it will be the first region in China to grant resident-like social benefits to holders of the permit, including public housing, public education, medical care and more. The services are only offered to PRC nationals with hukou in Shanghai, and are not available to PRC nationals with hukou in other regions.

See also 
 Mainland Travel Permit for Hong Kong and Macao Residents
 Residence Permit for Hong Kong, Macao, and Taiwan Residents
 Exit & Entry Permit
 Hong Kong Re-entry Permit

References

External links 
 How to apply for a mainland China entry permit in the Commissioner's Office of China's Foreign Ministry in the Hong Kong SAR
 How to apply for a mainland China entry permit in the China Travel Service (Hong Kong) Limited

Cross-Strait relations
International travel documents
Identity documents
Chinese passports